Oliver Hart Dockery (August 12, 1830 near Rockingham, North Carolina – March 21, 1906), son of Alfred Dockery, was a farmer and a politician, elected as a Republican Congressional Representative from North Carolina after the Civil War. Before the war he was elected in 1858 to one term in the State house of representatives.

Early life
Oliver Hart Dockery was born in 1830 in Rockingham, North Carolina. He attended public school and Wake Forest College; was graduated from the University of North Carolina at Chapel Hill in 1848. He studied law, but never practiced. He engaged in agricultural pursuits and became involved in politics. He was elected as a member of the State house of representatives in 1858 and 1859.

Civil War and after
During the American Civil War, he served for a short time in the Confederate service, but withdrew and advocated sustaining the Federal Government. Upon the readmission of North Carolina to representation, he was elected as a Republican to the Fortieth Congress; reelected to the Forty-first Congress and served from July 13, 1868, to March 3, 1871. He was chairman, Committee on the Freedmen's Bureau (Forty-first Congress); unsuccessful candidate for reelection in 1870 to the Forty-second Congress. After that he returned to agricultural pursuits. In 1875, following the increasing violence of the election campaign of 1874, when a Democratic governor was elected, he was a member of the State constitutional convention in 1875.

Dockery was an unsuccessful Republican nominee for Governor of North Carolina in 1888. He was appointed by the national Republican administration as United States consul general at Rio de Janeiro, Brazil, on June 14, 1889, and served until July 1, 1893. After the administration changed, he resumed agricultural pursuits.

He returned to politics in 1896, running as an unsuccessful Populist Party nominee for Lieutenant Governor of North Carolina. That year Republican Daniel Lindsay Russell was elected as governor, when a Populist candidate drew off some Democratic votes.

Dockery died in Baltimore, Maryland, March 21, 1906. He was interred in his family cemetery at Mangum, North Carolina.

See also
 40th United States Congress
 41st United States Congress

External links
 
 U.S. Congressional Biographical Directory entry
 OurCampaigns.com biography

Wake Forest University alumni
University of North Carolina at Chapel Hill alumni
1906 deaths
1830 births
North Carolina Populists
Republican Party members of the United States House of Representatives from North Carolina
19th-century American politicians